Chad Kammerer (born September 28, 1967) is director of scouting and a former assistant basketball coach of the National Basketball Association's Miami Heat. Kammerer joined the Heat in 2001 as an advance scout, became an assistant coach under Erik Spoelstra in 2008, and was part of the Miami Heat's 2012 NBA Finals Championship. Before joining the Heat, Kammerer worked as an assistant coach for Valparaiso University, the University of California at Los Angeles, Concordia University, and the University of Mississippi.

His father, Chet Kammerer, serves as the Miami Heat's Vice President of Player Personnel.

Early life 
Kammerer spent the early years of his childhood in Warsaw, Indiana before moving to California. His father, Chet, was the head basketball coach at Grace College while the family lived in Warsaw.  In 1975, the family moved to California, where Chet would become the head basketball coach at Westmont College. Years later, Chad Kammerer would become an all-conference college basketball player while attending Westmont College from 1986 to 1990. In 1993, Kammerer earned his master's degree from the University of Mississippi. The Westmont College basketball court was named Kammerer Court in 2008.

Career
Kammerer joined the Miami Heat as a scout in August 2002 after just two months as an assistant coach for Valparaiso University. He also served as an assistant coach for UCLA, Concordia University Irvine, and Ole Miss.

References 

1967 births
Living people
Basketball coaches from Indiana
College men's basketball players in the United States
Miami Heat assistant coaches
Ole Miss Rebels men's basketball coaches
Sportspeople from Fort Lauderdale, Florida
UCLA Bruins men's basketball coaches
University of Mississippi alumni
Valparaiso Beacons men's basketball coaches
Westmont College alumni